G. Venkat Swamy (5 October 1929 – 22 December 2014) was an Indian politician who was a member of the 14th Lok Sabha.

Career
He represented the Peddapalli constituency of Telangana and was a member of the Indian National Congress (INC) political party. He was popularly known as Kaka or Gudisela Venkataswamy. He was elected to Lok Sabha 7 times, 4 times from Peddapalli Lok Sabha and 3 times from Siddipet Lok Sabha. His son Gaddam Vivekanand represented Peddapalli Lok Sabha from 2009–2014.

Personal life
Both his sons Gaddam Vinod, former MLA and Minister and Gaddam Vivekananda are politicians. Venkatswamy died of an illness on 22 December 2014, in Care hospital in Hyderabad. He belonged to Mala community.

Positions held
 1957– 62 and 1978–84 Member, Andhra Pradesh Legislative Assembly (two terms)
 1967 Elected to 4th Lok Sabha
 1969 – 71 Member, Public Accounts Committee
 1971 Re-elected to 5th Lok Sabha (2nd term)
 Feb. 1973 – Nov. 1973 Union Deputy Minister, Labour and Rehabilitation
 Nov. 1973 – March 1977 Union Deputy Minister, Supply and Rehabilitation
 1977 Re-elected to 6th Lok Sabha (3rd term)
 1978 – 1982 Cabinet Minister, Labour and Civil Supply, Andhra Pradesh
 1982 – 1984 President, P.C.C.(I.), Andhra Pradesh
 1989 Elected to 9th Lok Sabha (4th term)
 1990 – 1991 Member, Committee on the Welfare of Scheduled Castes and Scheduled Tribes,  Member, Consultative Committee, Ministry of Industry
 1991 Re-elected to 10th Lok Sabha (5th term)
 21 June 1991-17 Jan. 1993 Union Minister of State, Rural Development
 18 January 1993 – 10 February 1995 Union Minister of State, Textiles (Independent Charge)
 10 February 1995 – 15 September 1995 Union Cabinet Minister, Textiles
 15 September 1995 – 10 May 1996 Union Cabinet Minister, Labour
 20 February 1996 – 16 May 1996 Union Cabinet Minister, Labour and Textiles
 1996 Re-elected to 11th Lok Sabha (6th term)
 2002–2004 President, A.I.C.C. (SC&ST)
 2004 Re-elected to 14th Lok Sabha (7th term)
 2009 No ticket to 15th Lok Sabha
 Deputy Leader Congress Parliamentary Party, Lok Sabha
 Member, Committee on Energy
 Member, Committee on Installation of Portraits/Statues of National Leaders, Parliamentarians in Parliament House Complex
 Member, Committee on Ethics
 Member, Consultative Committee, Ministry of Heavy Industries
 5 August 2007 onwards – Member, Standing Committee on Energy

Social And Cultural Activities
Founded, (i) Dr. B.R. Ambedkar Post Graduate Centre, (ii) Dr. B.R. Ambedkar Degree College, (iii) Law College, (iv) Junior College, (v) High School; General Secretary, National Huts Union, Hyderabad; provided permanent accommodation for 75,000 hut dwellers; Founder President, Dr. B.R. Ambedkar Education Society which was later converted into Public Education Trust and inaugurated by the then President of India Shri V.V. Giri in 1973; under this society 9 Colleges are running without taking donations.

References

External links
http://www.telanganastateofficial.com/g-venkat-swamy-congress-senior-kaka-expired-died/
http://www.simplytelangana.com/news/2010/08/20/hero-srikanths-case-sends-shivers-down-the-spine-for-andhrites/
http://www.andhrajyothy.com/Discussion.asp?id=81&page=2 

Union Ministers from Telangana
1929 births
Indian National Congress politicians from Telangana
2014 deaths
Politicians from Hyderabad, India
India MPs 2004–2009
India MPs 1996–1997
India MPs 1991–1996
India MPs 1989–1991
India MPs 1977–1979
India MPs 1971–1977
India MPs 1967–1970
Lok Sabha members from Andhra Pradesh
People from Karimnagar district